This bibliography of Abraham Lincoln is a comprehensive list of written and published works about or by Abraham Lincoln, the 16th president of the United States. In terms of primary sources containing Lincoln's letters and writings, scholars rely on The Collected Works of Abraham Lincoln, edited by Roy Basler, and others.  It only includes writings by Lincoln, and omits incoming correspondence. In the six decades since Basler completed his work, some new documents written by Lincoln have been discovered. Previously, a project was underway at the Papers of Abraham Lincoln to provide "a freely accessible comprehensive electronic edition of documents written by and to Abraham Lincoln".  The Papers of Abraham Lincoln completed Series I of their project The Law Practice of Abraham Lincoln in 2000. They electronically launched The Law Practice of Abraham Lincoln, Second Edition in 2009, and published a selective print edition of this series.  Attempts are still being made to transcribe documents for Series II (non-legal, pre-presidential materials) and Series III (presidential materials).

There have been 16,000 books and articles published on Lincoln—125 on the assassination alone—more than any other American. This listing is therefore highly selective and is based on the reviews in the scholarly journals, and recommended readings compiled by scholars.

Bibliography

Biographies
 Beveridge, Albert J. Abraham Lincoln: 1809–1858 (1928). 2 vols. to 1858; notable for strong, political coverage that tends to favor Stephen Douglas online edition
 Burlingame, Michael. Abraham Lincoln: A Life (2 vols. 2008); the most detailed life. Manuscript
 Burlingame, Michael. The Inner World of Abraham Lincoln (1994). Urbana: University of Illinois Press.
 Carpenter, Francis Bicknell (1866). Six Months at the White House with Abraham Lincoln: The Story of a Picture, New York: Hurd and Houghton (1866); also published as The Inner Life of Abraham Lincoln: Six Months at the White House, New York: Hurd and Houghton (1867). Author was the artist who painted First Reading of the Emancipation Proclamation of President Lincoln.
 Carwardine, Richard. Lincoln: A Life of Purpose and Power (2003), winner of the Lincoln Prize
 Lord Charnwood, Abraham Lincoln (1916), first bio by a non-American, Excerpt

 Donald, David Herbert. Lincoln (1995) Useful scholarly biography. Excerpt
 
 Gienapp, William E. Abraham Lincoln and Civil War America: A Biography (2002), short bio by scholar, online edition
 Goodwin, Doris Kearns. Team of Rivals: The Political Genius of Abraham Lincoln (2005), winner of the Lincoln Prize, basis for Lincoln.

 Guelzo, Allen C. Abraham Lincoln: Redeemer President (1999) online edition
 
 Harris, William C. Lincoln's Rise to the Presidency (2007) conservative author argues Lincoln was basically conservative Excerpt
 
 Holland, Josiah Gilbert (1866). Holland's Life of Abraham Lincoln. Springfield, Massachusetts: Gurdon Bill. Published in 1998 with introduction by Allen C. Guelzo, Lincoln and London: University of Nebraska Press.
 
 Luthin, Reinhard H. The Real Abraham Lincoln (1960), emphasis on politics
 
 McPherson, James M. Abraham Lincoln (2009) (short biography) Excerpt
 
 , vol 3. of detailed biography
 Miller, William Lee. Lincoln's Virtues: An Ethical Biography (2002). New York: Alfred A. Knopf. 
 Miller, William Lee. President Lincoln: The Duty of a Statesman (2008). New York: Alfred A. Knopf. 
 
 
  Pulitzer Prize–winning author
  detailed articles on many men and movements associated with AL

 
 Nicolay, John George and John Hay. Abraham Lincoln: a History (1890); online at Volume 1 and Volume 2 vol 6 10 volumes in all; highly detailed narrative of era written by Lincoln's top aides
 
 Oates, Stephen B. (1977). With Malice Toward None: The Life of Abraham Lincoln. Excerpt
 Randall, James G. Lincoln the President (4 vols., 1945–55; reprint 2000) by prize-winning scholar. Fourth volume: Randall, J.G. and Current, Richard N., Last Full Measure: Lincoln the President, New York: Dodd, Mead & Company (1955). Randall had died in 1953 and Current completed the book.
 Reynolds, David S. (2020). Abe: Abraham Lincoln in His Times. Penguin Press. 
 Sandburg, Carl. Abraham Lincoln: The Prairie Years (2 vol 1926) vol. 1 online (Subscription required.) vol. 2 online (Subscription required.); The War Years (4 vol 1939). Pulitzer Prize–winning biography by the famous poet
 Smith, Harvey H. (1931). Lincoln and the Lincolns. Pioneer Publications, Inc.
 Striner, Richard (2020). Summoned to Glory: The Audacious Life of Abraham Lincoln. Rowman & Littlefield Publishers. 
 Thomas, Benjamin P. Abraham Lincoln: A Biography (1952; 2nd ed. 2008) online edition
 
 White, Ronald C. (2021). Lincoln in Private: What His Most Personal Reflections Tell Us About Our Greatest President. Random House.

Specialty topics
  Published as a book, with "A few changes in language ... and a paragraph added." Boston, 1912
 Angle, Paul M., Here I Have Lived: A History of Lincoln's Springfield, 1821–1865, (1935) online edition
 
 Belz, Herman. Abraham Lincoln, Constitutionalism, and Equal Rights in the Civil War Era (1998)
 Boritt, Gabor S. Lincoln and the Economics of the American Dream (1994). Lincoln's economic theory and policies
 
 Boritt, Gabor S. ed. Lincoln the War President (1994)
 Bruce, Robert V. Lincoln and the Tools of War (1956) on weapons development during the war online edition
 Bush, Bryan S. Lincoln and the Speeds: The Untold Story of a Devoted and Enduring Friendship (2008) 
 Chittenden, Lucius E., Recollections of President Lincoln and His Administration, (1891). – Google Books
 
 Donald, David Herbert. Lincoln Reconsidered: Essays on the Civil War Era (1960)
 
 Donald, David Herbert. We Are Lincoln Men: Abraham Lincoln and His Friends Simon & Schuster, (2003).
 Emerson, James (2007). The Madness of Mary Lincoln. Southern Illinois University Press. .
 Foner, Eric. The Fiery Trial: Abraham Lincoln and American Slavery (2011); Pulitzer Prize excerpt and text search
 
 Gerleman, David J. Representative Lincoln at Work: Reconstructing a Legislative Career from Original Archival Documents (2017) Lincoln's congressional career The Capitol Dome - 2017 Dome 54.2
 
 Guelzo, Allen C., Lincoln's Emancipation Proclamation: The End of Slavery in America, Simon & Schuster (2004). 
 Guelzo, Allen C., Lincoln and Douglas: The Debates that Defined America, Simon & Schuster (2008). 
 
 Harris, William C. With Charity for All: Lincoln and the Restoration of the Union (1997). AL's plans for Reconstruction
 Hendrick, Burton J. Lincoln's War Cabinet (1946) online edition
 Hofstadter, Richard. The American Political Tradition: And the Men Who Made It (1948) ch. 5: "Abraham Lincoln and the Self-Made Myth."
 Howe, Daniel Walker, Why Abraham Lincoln Was a Whig. Journal of the Abraham Lincoln Association 16.1 (1995)
 
 Kashatus, William C. Abraham Lincoln, the Quakers and the Civil War: A Trial of Principle and Faith. Praeger, 2014. .
 Kunhardt Jr., Phillip B., Kunhardt III, Phillip, and Kunhardt, Peter W. Lincoln: An Illustrated Biography. Gramercy Books, New York, 1992. 
 Laxner, James, Staking Claims to a Continent: John A. Macdonald, Abraham Lincoln, Jefferson Davis, and the Making of North America (2016). Anansi Press 
 Lind, Michael, What Lincoln Believed. The Values and Convictions of America's Greatest President (2004). Anchor Books, a division of Random House, Inc. New York 
 McPherson, James M. Battle Cry of Freedom: The Civil War Era (1988). Pulitzer Prize winner surveys all aspects of the war
 
 Neely, Mark E. The Fate of Liberty: Abraham Lincoln and Civil Liberties (1992). Pulitzer Prize winner. online version
 Neely, Mark E. Lincoln and the Triumph of the Nation: Constitutional Conflict and the American Civil War (2011)
 Oakes, James. The Radical and the Republican: Frederick Douglass, Abraham Lincoln, and the Triumph of Antislavery Politics. New York: W.W. Norton & Company, Inc. 2007. 
 Ostendorf, Lloyd, and Hamilton, Charles, Lincoln in Photographs: An Album of Every Known Pose, Morningside House Inc., 1963, .
 Paludan, Philip S. The Presidency of Abraham Lincoln (1994), thorough treatment of Lincoln's administration
 
 Polsky, Andrew J. "'Mr. Lincoln's Army' Revisited: Partisanship, Institutional Position, and Union Army Command, 1861–1865." Studies in American Political Development (2002), 16: 176–207
 
 Randall, James G. Lincoln the Liberal Statesman (1947)
 
 Richardson, Heather Cox. The Greatest Nation of the Earth: Republican Economic Policies during the Civil War (1997)
 
 Shenk, Joshua Wolf. Lincoln's Melancholy: How Depression Challenged a President and Fueled His Greatness (2005)
 , a survey of contemporary criticism and polemic directed at Lincoln
 
 
 
 
 
 White, Jonathan W. Abraham Lincoln and Treason in the Civil War: The Trials of John Merryman (2011)
 White, Jonathan W. Emancipation, the Union Army, and the Reelection of Abraham Lincoln (2014)
 Williams, T. Harry. Lincoln and His Generals (1967).
 Wilson, Douglas L. Lincoln's Sword: The Presidency and the Power of Words (2006) .

Historiography and memory
 Barr, John M.  "Holding Up a Flawed Mirror to the American Soul: Abraham Lincoln in the Writings of Lerone Bennett Jr.," Journal of the Abraham Lincoln Association 35 (Winter 2014), 43–65.
 Barr, John M. Loathing Lincoln: An American Tradition from the Civil War to the Present (LSU Press, 2014).
 Boritt, Gabor S., ed. The Historian's Lincoln U. of Illinois Press, 1988
 
 Burkhimer, Michael. One hundred essential Lincoln books  (2003), examines the major books
 Foner, Eric, ed. Our Lincoln: New Perspectives on Lincoln and His World (2009), essays by scholars excerpt and text search
 Holt, Michael F. "Lincoln Reconsidered." Journal of American History 96.2 (2009): 451–455. online
 Holzer, Harold and Craig L. Symonds, eds. Exploring Lincoln: Great Historians Reappraise Our Greatest President (2015), essays by 16 scholars
 
 Kunhardt III,  Philip B. et al. Looking for Lincoln: The Making of an American Icon  (2012).
 Manning, Chandra, "The Shifting Terrain of Attitudes toward Abraham Lincoln and Emancipation", Journal of the Abraham Lincoln Association, 34 (Winter 2013), 18–39.
 Neely, Mark E. "The Lincoln Theme since Randall's Call: The Promises and Perils of Professionalism." Papers of the Abraham Lincoln Association 1 (1979): 10–70. in JSTOR

  wide-ranging survey of how Lincoln was remembered after 1865.
 Pinsker, Matthew. "Lincoln Theme 2.0." Journal of American History 96.2 (2009): 417–440. online
 Pinsker, Matthew. "Lincoln Theme 2.0." Journal of American History 96.2 (2009): 417–440. online
 Randall, James G.  "Has the Lincoln Theme Been Exhausted?." American Historical Review 41#2 (1936): 270–294. online
 
 Schwartz, Barry. Abraham Lincoln and the Forge of National Memory (2003) excerpt and text search
 Schwartz, Barry. Abraham Lincoln in the post-heroic era: history and memory in late twentieth-century America (2008)  excerpt and text search
 Smith, Adam I.P. "The 'Cult' of Abraham Lincoln and the Strange Survival of Liberal England in the Era of the World Wars", Twentieth Century British History, (Dec 2010) 21#4 pp. 486–509.
 
 Spielberg, Steven; Goodwin, Doris Kearns; Kushner, Tony. "Mr. Lincoln Goes to Hollywood", Smithsonian (2012) 43#7 pp. 46–53.

Lincoln in art and popular culture

 
 Ferguson, Andrew (2008). Land of Lincoln: Adventures in Abe's America. Grove Press. .

Primary sources
 Angle, Paul McClelland; Earl Schenck Miers (1992). The Living Lincoln: the Man, his Mind, his Times, and the War He Fought, Reconstructed from his Own Writings. Barnes & Noble Publishing. .
 Basler, Roy P. et al., eds. (1953). The Collected Works of Abraham Lincoln. 9 vols. Rutgers University Press. .
 
 
 Fehrenbacher, Don E., ed. Abraham Lincoln: Speeches and Writings 1832–1858 (Library of America, ed. 1989) 
 Fehrenbacher, Don E., ed. Abraham Lincoln: Speeches and Writings 1859–1865 (Library of America, ed. 1989) 
 
 Stowell, Daniel W., et al., eds. The Papers of Abraham Lincoln: Legal Documents and Cases. (4 vols.) University of Virginia Press, 2008

Attacks on Lincoln
 
 
 Marshall, John A., American Bastille (1870) Fifth edition: A History of the Illegal Arrests and Imprisonment of American Citizens in the Northern and Border States on Account of Their political opinions during the late Civil War. Part 1
 Masters, Edgar Lee. Lincoln: The Man (1931)

See also
 Bibliography of the American Civil War
 Bibliography of Ulysses S. Grant
 Bibliography of the Reconstruction Era

References

External links
 Booknotes interview with Harold Holzer on The Lincoln-Douglas Debates, August 22, 1993.
 Booknotes interview with Douglas Wilson on Honor's Voice: The Transformation of Abraham Lincoln, March 29, 1998.
 Booknotes interview with Lerone Bennett, Jr. on Forced Into Glory, September 10, 2000.
 Booknotes interview with Edward Steers, Jr. on Blood on the Moon: The Assassination of Abraham Lincoln, February 17, 2002.
 Booknotes interview with Frank Williams on Judging Lincoln, November 10, 2002.
 Booknotes interview with Matthew Pinsker on Lincoln's Sanctuary: Abraham Lincoln and the Soldiers' Home, December 21, 2003.
 Booknotes interview with Mario Cuomo on Why Lincoln Matters, July 25, 2004.
 C-SPAN Q&A interview with Harold Holzer on Lincoln President-Elect: Abraham Lincoln and the Great Secession Winter, 1860–1861, November 9, 2008
 In Depth discussion of books on Lincoln, February 1, 2009 with Frank J. Williams and Edna Greene Medford.

Bibliographies of people
Bibliographies of presidents of the United States
Abraham Lincoln-related lists